Dar Nga Pyuu is Burmese comedy film directed by Kyaw Thar Gyi starring Myint Myat, Shwe Thamee and Khin Hlaing.

The movie was officially released on September 9, 2018 at cinemas around Myanmar.

References

2018 films
Burmese comedy films